Gerald Grant Sim (4 June 1925 – 11 December 2014) was an English television and film actor who is perhaps best known for having played the Rector in To the Manor Born.

Early life
Sim was born in Liverpool, Lancashire. He was the younger brother of the actress Sheila Sim and brother-in-law of the actor/director Richard Attenborough.

Career
Sim made over a hundred film and television appearances, beginning with an uncredited role in the film Fame Is the Spur (1947). Film and TV roles include The L-Shaped Room (1962), Séance on a Wet Afternoon (1964), King Rat (1965), The Avengers (1966), Oh! What a Lovely War (1969), Ryan's Daughter (1970), Dr. Jekyll and Sister Hyde (1971), Frenzy (1972), Young Winston (1972), The Fall and Rise of Reginald Perrin (episode 7, as the Vicar - 1976), A Bridge Too Far (1977), The New Avengers (1977), Edward & Mrs. Simpson (1978), Gandhi (1982), as Dr George Bagster Phillips in Jack the Ripper (1988), Chaplin (1992) and Patriot Games (1992). 

Another occasion in which he played a vicar was when he appeared in an episode of Keeping Up Appearances. By then retired, he appeared in the 2007 25th anniversary special episode of To the Manor Born.

Personal life and death
Sim was married to the British actress Deidre Benner, from 1967 until her death in 1999. In his later years, Sim lived in Denville Hall, the same north London care home for entertainers as his sister and brother-in-law, who occupied the rooms on either side of him. Sim died on 11 December 2014.

Filmography

Fame Is the Spur (1947) – Reporter (uncredited)
Josephine and Men (1955) – Detective Sgt. Allen
The Angry Silence (1960) – Masters
Cone of Silence (1960) – Operations Room Worker (uncredited)
Whistle Down the Wind (1961) – Detective Wilcox
Flat Two (1962)
Only Two Can Play (1962) – Cigarette Thief at Party (uncredited)
The Painted Smile (1962) – Plain Clothes Policeman
The Amorous Prawn (1962) – 1st Telephone Operator
The L-Shaped Room (1962) – Doctor in Hospital
The Wrong Arm of the Law (1963) – Airfield Official (uncredited)
I Could Go On Singing (1963) – Assistant Mgr. at the Palladium
Heavens Above! (1963) – Self-Service Store Manager
The Pumpkin Eater (1964) – Man at party
Séance on a Wet Afternoon (1964) – Beedle
King Rat (1965) – Jones
The Murder Game (1965) – Larry Landstorm
The Wrong Box (1966) – First Undertaker
The Whisperers (1967) – Mr. Conrad
Our Mother's House (1967) – Bank Clerk
Nobody Runs Forever (1968) – Airport Official (uncredited)
Oh! What a Lovely War (1969) – Chaplain
Strange Report (TV) (1969) – Chief Superintendent Cavanagh
The Madwoman of Chaillot (1969) – Julius
Mischief (1969) – Jim
The Man Who Haunted Himself (1970) – Morrison
The Last Grenade (1970) – Dr. Griffiths (uncredited)
Doctor in Trouble (1970) – 1st Doctor
Ryan's Daughter (1970) – Captain
The Raging Moon (1971) – Rev. Carbett
Dr. Jekyll and Sister Hyde (1971) – Prof. Robertson
Frenzy (1972) – Mr. Usher – Solicitor in Pub
Dr. Phibes Rises Again (1972) – Hackett
Young Winston (1972) – Engineer
Kadoyng (1972) – Prof. Balfour
No Sex Please, We're British (1973) – Reverend Mower
The Slipper and the Rose: The Story of Cinderella (1976) – 1st Lord of the Navy
A Bridge Too Far (1977) – Colonel Sims
Gandhi (1982) – Magistrate
Miss Marple (1985) – Coroner
Cry Freedom (1987) – Police Doctor
Number One Gun (1990) – Stockwell – MI5 Boss
Patriot Games (1992) – Lord Justice
Chaplin (1992) – Doctor
Shadowlands (1993) – Superintendent Registrar

References

External links

1925 births
2014 deaths
Male actors from Liverpool
English male film actors
English male television actors
Alumni of RADA
Attenborough family